Bolinao, officially the Municipality of Bolinao (Bolinao: Babali nin Bolinao; ;), is a 1st class municipality in the province of Pangasinan, Philippines. According to the 2020 census, it has a population of 83,979 people.

Sea urchins are regularly harvested at Isla Silaki, Bolinao. The town, aside from being a fishing domain, is also a heritage site in the Philippines, possessing an olden church surrounded by heritage houses. The town is also the location of the cave where the gold-teeth Bolinao Skulls with fish scale designs were found. Scholars have been pushing for the town's cultural landscape into the UNESCO World Heritage List.

History 
Folk etymology attributes the name "Bolinao", a remote fishing enclave, from the fish specie "monamon" commonly called "bolinao" by the Tagalogs, Bicolanos and the Visayans. A theory also points out that once upon a time "pamulinawen" trees grew luxuriantly along its shores, thus, the Ilocano migrants who crossed Lingayen Gulf named it phonetically similar to the name of the tree in their language. Nowadays, however, such tree does not exist in abundance in the area.

An account narrates the arrival of Juan de Salcedo and his crew reached Bolinao and chanced upon a Chinese Sampan who captured a native chieftain. Salcedo and his men liberated the natives and the latter immediately pledged vassalage to the King of Spain.

According to oral history, the town of Bolinao used to be a small settlement in what is now Barrio Binabalian in Santiago Island, then having a population of just over a hundred families. It is said that Captain Pedro Lombi founded the town of Bolinao in 1575. A decade later, Dominican Friar Esteban Marin became the first Spanish missionary to evangelize the people of Bolinao. For two years he worked in Bolinao before he was assigned as prior in Batac, Ilocos Norte.

The Dominicans ended their service in 1607 to be replaced by the Augustinian Recollects headed by Fr. Jeronimo de Cristo and Dr. Andres del Espiritu Santo. At this time, the old town of Bolinao was still located along the coast of Pangasinan. Due to pirate attacks, the town was transferred to the mainland in 1609.

This town formerly included the neighboring town of Anda, but Anda became an independent municipality on May 26, 1849.

First Mass 
On November 18, 2007, Bolinao challenged the belief that the first Mass in the Philippines was held on March 31, 1521, Easter Sunday, at Limasawa in Southern Leyte. Memorial markers (donated by Italian priest Luigi Malamocco, 62, from Odorico's hometown of Friuli, Italy) were set in the town's church and on Santiago Island, claiming that in 1324, Franciscan missionaries led by an Italian priest named Odorico celebrated a thanksgiving Mass thereat and also baptized natives.

Hard coal spill 
Bolinao Mayor Alfonso Celeste said the local government will file damage suit against Indonesian owners of the barge APOL 3003. The University of the Philippines Marine Science Institute (UPMSI) stated that the environmental damage was P 54.9 million ($1 =- P 40). The barge towed by a tug boat from Indonesia to the power plant in Sual, Pangasinan on November 27 when Typhoon "Mina"  winds destroyed its anchor and rope, then hurled to Ilog Malino reef, spilling 95% of its coal cargo. The hard coal spill spread to 330,000 square metres of coral and sea grass areas.

Bolinao Skull 

The Bolinao Skull is a skull dated between the 14th and 15th centuries A.D. recovered in the Balingasay archeological site in Bolinao. The Bolinao Skull is the most well known artifact from the site, noted for the intricate gold ornamentation formed in the shape of scales on the surfaces of its teeth. However, 67 other skulls containing teeth with less extensive gold ornamentation were also found at the Balingasay site. The skull is now displayed within the National Museum of Anthropology in Manila.

World War II 
Japanese forces landed and occupied Bolinao in December 1941 and established a military garrison. A joint military force of American, Australian and Philippine Commonwealth troops, including local resistance fighters, liberated Bolinao in January 1945.

Geography 
Bolinao is the northernmost town in the province, with many white-sand beaches.

Barangays 
Bolinao is politically subdivided into 30 barangays. These barangays are headed by elected officials: Barangay Captain, Barangay Council, whose members are called Barangay Councilors. All are elected every three years.

 Arnedo
 Balingasay
 Binabalian
 Cabuyao
 Catuday
 Catungi
 Concordia (Poblacion)
 Culang
 Dewey
 Estanza
 Germinal (Poblacion)
 Goyoden
 Ilog-Malino
 Lambes
 Liwa-liwa
 Lucero
 Luciente 1.0 (J.Celeste)
 Luciente 2.0
 Luna
 Patar
 Pilar
 Salud
 Samang Norte
 Samang Sur
 Sampaloc
 San Roque
 Tara
 Tupa
 Victory
 Zaragoza

NOTE: The barangays listed in italics indicate that they are located within Santiago Island.

Climate

Demographics

Language 

The word Bolinao is a term used for the name of the town, the people, and the language.

The Bolinao people generally speak Pangasinan, Ilocano, Tagalog, and their own unique native language called Bolinao, which is also used in the nearby town of Anda, a former barangay of Bolinao. The Bolinao language is closely related to Sambalic. Bolinao was part of the province of Zambales from the mid-18th century before being turned over to Pangasinan in 1903. Most locals generally understand and speak English.

The Mother Tongue Policy of the Department of Education is enforced in the elementary schools of these barangays to empower the native languages in town.

Economy

Government
Bolinao, belonging to the first congressional district of the province of Pangasinan, is governed by a mayor designated as its local chief executive and by a municipal council as its legislative body in accordance with the Local Government Code. The mayor, vice mayor, and the councilors are elected directly by the people through an election which is being held every three years.

Elected officials

Education

Tertiary schools
 Bolinao Lighthouse School of Tourism and Learning Center Ilog-Malino Campus

Secondary
Public schools:

 Arnedo National High School
 Balingasay National High School
 Binabalian National High School
 Bolinao School of Fisheries
 Catubig Integrated School
 Catuday National High School
 Dewey National High School
 Ilog-Malino National High School
 Liwa-liwa Integrated School
 Luciente II National High School
 Luna National High School
 Pilar National High School
 Sampaloc National High School
 Tupa Integrated School
 Zaragoza National High School

Private School
 Cape Bolinao High School

Images

See also
 Cape Bolinao Lighthouse
 Bolinao 52, a 2007 documentary film
 Saint James the Great Parish Church (Bolinao)

References

External links 

 Official Bolinao tourism website
 Municipal Profile at the National Competitiveness Council of the Philippines
 Bolinao at the Pangasinan Government Website
 Local Governance Performance Management System
 [ Philippine Standard Geographic Code]
 Philippine Census Information
 

Municipalities of Pangasinan
Beaches of the Philippines